William Allen Northcott (28 January 1854 – 25 January 1917) was an American politician. Between 1897 and 1905 he served two terms as Lieutenant Governor of Illinois.

Life
William Northcott was born in Murfreesboro, Tennessee. He studied law and practiced as an attorney. Between 1882 and 1892 he was the District Attorney in Bond County, Illinois. He joined the Republican Party and in 1896 he was elected to the office of the Lieutenant Governor of Illinois. In this position he served two terms between 11 January 1897 and 9 January 1905 when his second term ended. In this function he was the deputy of the Governors John Riley Tanner and his successor Richard Yates Jr. In 1904 he was an alternate delegate to Republican National Convention. Between 1905 and 1914 Northcott was the U.S. Attorney for the Eastern District of Illinois. He died on 25 January 1917 in Excelsior Springs, Missouri and he was buried on the Oak Ridge Cemetery in Springfield, Illinois.

See also
1900 Illinois lieutenant gubernatorial election

External links
 
 The Political Graveyard

Literature
Proceedings of the Illinois State Bar Association, 1917, p. 139

1854 births
1917 deaths
People from Murfreesboro, Tennessee
People from Bond County, Illinois
Illinois lawyers
Lieutenant Governors of Illinois
Illinois Republicans
19th-century American lawyers